Farm to Market Road 270 (FM 270) is a farm to market road in the U.S. state of Texas, located in the Houston–Sugar Land–Baytown metropolitan area. The road is known locally as Egret Bay Boulevard.

The short highway travels northwest (parallel to Interstate 45) from FM 646 (future SH 99) in League City, crossing over Clear Creek at the Galveston– Harris county line, to NASA Road 1 west of the Johnson Space Center.

Route description
FM 270 begins at an intersection with FM 646 (future SH 99) in League City, Galveston County, heading north-northwest on two-lane Egret Bay Boulevard. The road heads past residential areas to the west and fields to the east before passing through more fields and reaching an intersection with SH 96. The highway continues into a mix of residential and commercial areas with some fields and trees. FM 270 becomes a five-lane road with a center left-turn lane and continues through more developed areas, turning northwest and crossing FM 518. The road widens to seven lanes total and passes businesses before heading into wooded areas and crossing the Clear Creek into the Clear Lake City section of Houston in Harris County. FM 270 heads through residential areas before passing commercial establishments and ending at an interchange with NASA Road 1. Past here, the road becomes El Camino Real.

History

Previous route

Current route
The current FM 270 was designated on October 30, 1970, running from NASA Road 1 to FM 518. It was extended on August 31, 1987, to its current length. On June 27, 1995, the entire route was redesignated Urban Road 270 (UR 270). The designation reverted to FM 270 with the elimination of the Urban Road system on November 15, 2018.

Major intersections

See also

References

0270
Transportation in Galveston County, Texas
Transportation in Harris County, Texas